Brodmann area 9, or BA9, refers to a cytoarchitecturally defined portion of the frontal cortex in the brain of humans and other primates. It contributes to the dorsolateral and medial prefrontal cortex.

Functions
The area is involved in short term memory, evaluating recency, overriding automatic responses, verbal fluency, error detection, auditory verbal attention, inferring the intention of others, inferring deduction from spatial imagery, inductive reasoning, attributing intention, sustained attention involved in counting a series of auditory stimuli, and displays lower levels of energy consumption in individuals suffering from bipolar disorder.

The area found on the left hemisphere is at least partially responsible for empathy, idioms, processing pleasant and unpleasant emotional scenes, self criticisms and attention to negative emotions.

On the right hemisphere the region is involved in attributing intention, theory of mind, suppressing sadness, working memory, spatial memory, recognition, recall, recognizing the emotions of others, planning, calculation, semantic and perceptual processing of odors, religiosity, and attention to positive emotions.

Guenon
Brodmann area 9 also exists in the frontal lobe of the guenon. Brodmann-1909 regarded it on the whole as topographically and cytoarchitecturally homologous to the granular frontal area 9 and frontopolar area 10 in the human. Distinctive features (Brodmann-1905): Unlike Brodmann area 6 (Brodmann-1909), area 9 has a distinct internal granular layer (IV); unlike Brodmann area 6 or Brodmann area 8 (Brodmann-1909), its internal pyramidal layer (V) is divisible into two sublayers, an outer layer 5a of densely distributed medium-size ganglion cells that partially merges with layer IV, and an inner, clearer, cell-poor layer 5b; the pyramidal cells of sublayer 3b of the external pyramidal layer (III) are smaller and sparser in distribution; the external granular layer (II) is narrow, with small numbers of sparsely distributed granule cells.

Image

See also
 Brodmann area
 Dorsomedial prefrontal cortex
 List of regions in the human brain

References

External links

https://web.archive.org/web/20141104204919/http://www.skiltopo.com/1/index.htm#BA9L
 For Neuroanatomy of this area see BrainInfo

09
Frontal lobe